Zota District is one of eight districts located in Bong County, Liberia.

Settlements
Settlements in Zota District include:

Belefuanai
Belifine
Bonia 
Bunga
Gannyou
Gawata

References

Districts of Liberia
Bong County